Christian Javier López Payán (born February 18, 1992) is a former Mexican professional footballer who played for Tecos F.C..

External links
 

Living people
1992 births
Mexican footballers
Association football forwards
Dorados de Sinaloa footballers
C.D. Veracruz footballers
Mineros de Zacatecas players
Tecos F.C. footballers
Liga MX players
Ascenso MX players
Liga Premier de México players
Tercera División de México players
Footballers from Sinaloa